Leon II was King of Abkhazia from circa 780 to 828. He was the nephew and successor of Leon I of the Anchabadze dynasty and from maternal side grandson of the reigning Khagan of the Khazars (possibly Bihar or Baghatur).

Life 
Leon II exploited existed dynastic union to acquire Lazica in the 770s, as John was dead and Juansher grew old. Towards circa 778, Leon II won his full independence with the help of the Khazars to assumed the title of "King of the Abkhazians" and transferred his capital from Anacopia to the western Georgian city of Kutaisi. According to Georgian annals, Leon subdivided his kingdom into eight duchies: Abkhazia proper, Tskhumi, Bedia, Guria, Racha and Takveri, Svaneti, Argveti, and Kutatisi. Leon II during his life strengthened the contacts with the political circles of Tao-Klarjeti by means of the dynasty marriages. 

During his reign Abkhazian kingdom was the stage of the state building and was less active in the matter of spreading the borders of the kingdom to the East. After obtaining of the state independence, the matter of the church independence became the main problem. Leon II was not able to conduct the independent church policy till it was dependent on Constantinople. Besides, the empire tried, with the help of the church to influence the inner and foreign policy of the kingdom. Church split of Abkhazia from Constantinople in Vakhushti Bagrationi's opinion had place during Leon II reign.

Family 
Leon married an unknown princess:

Issue 
Theodosius II,  king of the Abkhazia from 828 until 855.
Demetrius II, king of the Abkhazia from 855 until 864.
George I, king of the Abkhazia from 864 until 871.

Genealogy

See also 
Divan of the Abkhazian Kings

References

Sources 
 Kevin Alan Brook. The Jews of Khazaria. 2nd ed. Rowman & Littlefield Publishers, Inc, 2006.
 Peter B. Golden. Khazar Studies: An Historio-Philological Inquiry into the Origins of the Khazars. Budapest: Akademia Kiado, 1980.

8th-century Kings of Abkhazia
Khazars
9th-century Kings of Abkhazia